Mike Simpson, professionally known as MJ Simpson, is a British author, journalist, scriptwriter and occasional actor. He was deputy editor of the British science fiction magazine SFX from 1995 to 1998. He was for several years an expert on the television writer and novelist Douglas Adams and his work.

Simpson wrote two books about Adams' Hitchhiker's Guide and was involved in running ZZ9 Plural Z Alpha, the official Hitchhiker's Guide appreciation society. In 2005, on the release of the Hitchhiker's Guide to the Galaxy movie, Simpson closed down his website Planet Magrathea and gave up writing about the subject.

He is now an authority on modern British horror films, a subject on which he has written one book so far as well as a regular column '21st Century Frights' in Scream magazine.

Simpson's website about 'Cult movies and the people who make them' has been running continually since January 2002, initially at www.mjsimpson.co.uk (now defunct) and, since 2013, on Blogger.

Bibliography 
 The Pocket Essential Hitchhiker's Guide
 Hitchhiker: A Biography of Douglas Adams (2003)
 Urban Terrors: New British Horror Cinema 1997-2008 (2012)

References

External links
British Horror Revival blog by M. J. Simpson

Year of birth missing (living people)
Living people
21st-century British journalists
21st-century British non-fiction writers
British male journalists